Yoga in Italy is the practice of yoga, whether for exercise, therapy, or other reasons, in Italy.

History

A pioneer of modern yoga as exercise in Italy was Vanda Scaravelli (1908-1999), author of the "classic" 1991 book Awakening the spine. 

Another pioneer, Carlo Patrian (1930-2008), began studying yoga in 1950 and founded the yoga institute that still bears his name in Milan in 1965.

In the 21st century, yoga is growing steadily in Italy, and the International Day of Yoga (21 June) is celebrated across the country each summer. By 2017 there were some 830 recognised yoga schools in the country. The 2018 Coop report (compiled by Nielsen in 2017) stated that 11% of the women of Italy and 3% of the men practiced yoga or Pilates; 32% of those consulted said they intended to practice in future. 

Among the forms of yoga in Italy are hybrids such as aerial yoga and Acroyoga. An approach to spiritual and social growth through yoga and meditation is being developed by the mountaineer and yoga teacher Heinz Grill.

Italy is a popular destination for yoga tourism, with yoga retreats and holidays taught in various languages.

Regulation

By 2019, yoga teacher training was still not regulated in Italy despite the country's 3 million yoga practitioners, resulting, according to Bianca Carati writing in La Stampa, in excessively "accelerated" courses, some taking as little as 2 months to deliver 150 hours of training at a cost between €1500 and €3000. Carati reported that the Associazione Italiana Iyengar yoga considered this inadequate; it required at least 3 years of training. It, along with the Associazione Italiana Insegnanti Yoga and the Associazione Yoga Satyananda, has created a set of proposed standards for yoga teacher training in Italy, requiring at least 500 hours of training over a period of at least four years, and to have taught for at least four years.

See also

 European Union of Yoga
 Yoga in Britain
 Yoga in France
 Yoga in Germany
 Yoga in Russia
 Yoga in Sweden
 Yoga in the United States

Notes

References 

Italy
Italian culture